King Progress is the debut album by Jackson Heights. The album was released in the U.K. on Charisma Records in 1970. In the U.S., the album was released on Mercury Records in 1971. The album is known for the song "The Cry of Eugene", a track originally written and played by The Nice on their first album, The Thoughts of Emerlist Davjack.

Tony Stratton-Smith wrote in the original liner notes that "this record gives ribs and muscle to acoustic music."

It would be the only album that included Charlie Harcourt (who would later go on to join Cat Mother & the All Night Newsboys and Lindisfarne), Tommy Slone, and Mario Enrique Covarrubias Tapia who would leave shortly after the album was released.

Track listing
All songs written by Lee Jackson and Charlie Harcourt except noted. 
 "Mr. Screw" - 3:21
 "Since I Last Saw You" – 7:03
 "Sunshine Freak" – 4:52
 "King Progress" – 3:30
 "Doubting Thomas" – 4:16
 "Insomnia" – 5:03
 "The Cry of Eugene" (Keith Emerson, Lee Jackson, David O'List) – 7:54

Personnel
Jackson Heights
 Lee Jackson - lead vocals, 6- and 12-string acoustic guitars, harmonica
 Charlie Harcourt - electric and Spanish guitars, backing vocals, Harpsichord, Mellotron, organ, piano
 Mario Enrique Covarrubias Tapia - bass and Spanish guitars, backing vocals
 Tommy Slone - drums, congas, triangle, timpani, abdominal percussion (5)

References
Jim Sutherland's Jackson Heights web page

1970 debut albums
Charisma Records albums
Mercury Records albums
Jackson Heights (band) albums
Albums produced by Lee Jackson (bassist)
Albums with cover art by Hipgnosis
Albums recorded at IBC Studios